Olhynka is an urban-type settlement in Volnovakha Raion (district) in Donetsk Oblast of eastern Ukraine. Population:

References

Urban-type settlements in Volnovakha Raion